Arif Alaftargil (born October 27, 1973) is a retired Olympian alpine skier from Turkey, who competed in slalom and giant slalom events.

Early life
Arif Alaftargil was born in Erzurum, Turkey. He is a member of skier family. His father İlhami owned a ski equipment store at Palandöken Mountain, and his three brothers are skiers. His younger brother Atakan Alaftargil competed for Turkey at the 2002 Winter Olympics in Salt Lake City, USA.

Career
Arif Alaftargil competed for Turkey at the 1998 Winter Olympics ranking at 29th place in the slalom event with his time of 2:25.09.

References

External links
 
 

1973 births
Sportspeople from Erzurum
Turkish male alpine skiers
Olympic alpine skiers of Turkey
Alpine skiers at the 1998 Winter Olympics
Living people
20th-century Turkish people